İsmet Kotak (1939 – 11 September 2011) was a Turkish Cypriot politician, public administrator, journalist and columnist.

İsmet Kotak was Member of Parliament (1970–85, 1990–93), Minister of Labour (1969–76), Minister of Industry and Co-operatives (1982–83), director-general of the Bayrak Radio Television Corporation, president of Press Council in Turkish Republic of Northern Cyprus. He was one of the co-founders of Democratic People's Party and founder of the Free Democratic Party.

References

1939 births
2011 deaths
People from Famagusta
Leaders of political parties in Northern Cyprus
Democratic Party (Northern Cyprus) politicians
Turkish Cypriot columnists
Ankara University Faculty of Political Sciences alumni
Deaths from aortic dissection
Date of birth unknown